Youa can refer to:
 A place in Guinea
 A character in Gran Torino